Nora Brockstedt (20 January 1923 – 5 November 2015) was a Norwegian singer.

In her last years, she focused more on the jazz genre, with successful albums like As Time Goes By (JazzAvdelingen, 2004) and Christmas Songs (JazzAvdelingen, 2005). She sang jazz in the 1960s, but was more known for her 'conventional' pop songs.

She died after a short illness at Ullevaal Hospital in Oslo on 5 November 2015.

See also
Eurovision Song Contest 1960
Eurovision Song Contest 1961
Melodi Grand Prix
Jazz

References

1923 births
2015 deaths
Musicians from Oslo
Eurovision Song Contest entrants of 1960
Eurovision Song Contest entrants of 1961
Melodi Grand Prix contestants
Melodi Grand Prix winners
Eurovision Song Contest entrants for Norway
Norwegian women jazz singers
20th-century Norwegian women singers
20th-century Norwegian singers
21st-century Norwegian women singers
21st-century Norwegian singers